In the 2022–23 season, JS Kabylie is competing in the Ligue 1 for the 54th season, as well as the Algerian Cup and Champions League. It is their 54th consecutive season in the top flight of Algerian football. They competing in Ligue 1, the Algerian Cup and Champions League. On November 29, 2022, Djaffar Ait Mouloud president of the Club sportif amateur (CSA) which owns JS Kabylie, has announced an agreement with the public company ATM Mobilis for the purchase of 80% of the club's shares.

Squad list
Players and squad numbers last updated on 5 February 2023.Note: Flags indicate national team as has been defined under FIFA eligibility rules. Players may hold more than one non-FIFA nationality.

Competitions

Overview

{| class="wikitable" style="text-align: center"
|-
!rowspan=2|Competition
!colspan=8|Record
!rowspan=2|Started round
!rowspan=2|Final position / round
!rowspan=2|First match	
!rowspan=2|Last match
|-
!
!
!
!
!
!
!
!
|-
| Ligue 1

|  
| To be confirmed
| 26 August 2022
| In Progress
|-
| Algerian Cup

| Round of 64 
| Round of 32 
| 25 November 2022	
| 21 February 2023
|-
| Champions League

| First round
| To be confirmed
| 11 September 2022
| In Progress
|-
! Total

Ligue 1

League table

Results summary

Results by round

Matches
The league fixtures were announced on 19 July 2022.

Algerian Cup

Champions League

Qualifying rounds

First round

Second round

Group stage

Group A

Squad information

Playing statistics

|-
! colspan=14 style=background:#dcdcdc; text-align:center| Goalkeepers

|-
! colspan=14 style=background:#dcdcdc; text-align:center| Defenders

|-
! colspan=14 style=background:#dcdcdc; text-align:center| Midfielders

|-
! colspan=14 style=background:#dcdcdc; text-align:center| Forwards

|-
! colspan=14 style=background:#dcdcdc; text-align:center| Players transferred out during the season

Goalscorers

Includes all competitive matches. The list is sorted alphabetically by surname when total goals are equal.

Transfers

In

Summer

Winter

Out

Summer

Winter

New contracts

Notes

References

2022-23
Algerian football clubs 2022–23 season
2022–23 CAF Champions League participants seasons